is a Japanese racing cyclist. She rode in the women's scratch event at the 2018 UCI Track Cycling World Championships.

References

1997 births
Living people
Japanese female cyclists
Place of birth missing (living people)
Cyclists at the 2018 Asian Games
Medalists at the 2018 Asian Games
Asian Games bronze medalists for Japan
Asian Games medalists in cycling
20th-century Japanese women
21st-century Japanese women